Eupithecia kamburonga is a moth in the family Geometridae. It is found on Borneo.

References

Moths described in 1976
kamburonga
Moths of Asia